Franz Sterzl (born 8 February 1908, date of death unknown) was an Austrian athlete. He competed in the men's decathlon at the 1936 Summer Olympics.

References

1908 births
Year of death missing
Athletes (track and field) at the 1936 Summer Olympics
Austrian decathletes
Olympic athletes of Austria
People from Neunkirchen District, Austria
Sportspeople from Lower Austria